Chapel Hill or Chapelhill may refer to:

Places

Antarctica
Chapel Hill (Antarctica)

Australia
Chapel Hill, Queensland, a suburb of Brisbane
Chapel Hill, South Australia, in the Mount Barker council area

Canada
Chapel Hill, Ottawa, a neighbourhood of Ottawa

Ireland
Chapelhill (townland), in County Laois

United Kingdom
Chapel Hill, Lincolnshire, England
Chapel Hill, Monmouthshire, Wales
Chapel Hill, North Yorkshire, England

United States
Chapel Hill, Alabama (disambiguation)
Chapel Hills Mall, Colorado Springs, Colorado
Chapel Hill, Indiana
Chapel Hill, Indianapolis, a neighborhood on the west side of Indianapolis, Indiana
Chapel Hill Historic District (Cumberland, Maryland), listed on the NRHP in Allegany County
Chapel Hill, New Jersey, an unincorporated community
Chapel Hill Bible Church, Marlboro, New York, listed on the NRHP in Ulster County
Chapel Hill, North Carolina, a town
Chapel Hill Historic District (Chapel Hill, North Carolina), listed on the NRHP in Orange County
Chapel Hill Town Hall, listed on the NRHP in Orange County, North Carolina
Old Chapel Hill Cemetery, listed on the NRHP in Orange County, North Carolina
University of North Carolina at Chapel Hill, a university within the town
West Chapel Hill Historic District, North Carolina
Chapel Hill, a neighborhood centered on Chapel Hill Mall in Akron, Ohio
Chapel Hill, Tennessee, a town
Chapel Hill Cumberland Presbyterian Church, Chapel Hill, Tennessee, listed on the NRHP in Marshall County
Chapel Hill (Berryville, Virginia), listed on the NRHP in Clarke County
Chapel Hill (Lexington, Virginia), listed on the NRHP in Rockbridge County
Chapel Hill (Mint Spring, Virginia), listed on the NRHP in Augusta County

Music
"Chapel Hill", a song by John Craigie from the album October is the Kindest Month
"Chapel Hill", a song by Sonic Youth from the album Dirty

See also
Chapel Hill High School (disambiguation)
Chapel Hill Historic District (disambiguation)